Ivančice is a town in Brno-Country District in the South Moravian Region of the Czech Republic. It has about 9,700 inhabitants. The historic town centre is well preserved and is protected by law as an urban monument zone.

Administrative parts

Villages of Alexovice, Budkovice, Hrubšice, Letkovice, Němčice and Řeznovice are administrative parts of Ivančice.

Geography
It lies in the Boskovice Furrow at the confluence of the Oslava, Jihlava and Rokytná rivers.

History
The first written mention of Ivančice is from 1212. In 1288, it became a royal town of King Wenceslaus II. In 1304, the town was burned down by the Cumans. In 1424–1435, the town was occupied by the Hussites. Ivančice ceased to be a royal town in 1486, when it was acquired by the Pernštejn family and later by the Lords of Lipá.

In the 16th century, Ivančice became the centre of Moravian education thanks to the Unity of the Brethren. The town prospered until the Thirty Years' War, when it was looted by the troops of Gabriel Bethlen and later occupied by the Swedish army. The war was followed by a plague epidemic and many houses remained desolate. However, the town slowly managed to recover.

Jewish community

A Jewish ghetto was established maybe already in the 13th century, and was one of the oldest and most important in Moravia. The first written mention of the community is from 1454, when the refugees from Brno came here. The community was placed outside the town proper. Later it was moved inside the town walls but administered as an independent municipality, with its own Jewish mayor.

The reign of King Ferdinand I in the early 16th century placed economic restrictions on the Jews of Ivančice. The Counter Reformation and the Thirty Years' War reduced the number of Protestants living in Ivančice, and at the same time, the Jewish community grew thanks to the arrival of refugees from Bohemia. This growth resulted in an edict issued in 1650 forbidding any Jews to inhabit Moravia who had not resided there before 1618. A formal Jewish community was established during the 17th century.

The Jewish population was at its peak in 1835, when there lived 877 Jews. In the first half of the 19th century, the community formed around 25% of the town's population. After the revolution in 1848, Jews gained full civil rights. Between 1849 and 1919, there was a self-governing Jewish political community in Ivančice. After the proclamation of an independent Czechoslovakia and the end of the World War I, it was merged with the Christian rest of the town, however, the community continued its activities. The community disappeared as a result of the Holocaust during World War II.

Demographics

Sights

The landmark of the central town square is the Church of the Assumption of the Virgin Mary. It is a Gothic building with a prismatic tower. In the middle of the square is Marian column from 1726 and a fountain with a statue of Saint Florian.

The Renaissance building of the Old Town Hall from 1544 houses a museum with Monument of Alphonse Mucha, who was born right here. The museum also has an exhibition on life and work of actor Vladimír Menšík, another famous native. The former residence of Lords of Lipá is another sight of the town square. Today it serves as a town hall.

The Church of Saints Peter and Paul in Řeznovice is the most valuable monument of the town. It is a Romanesque structure from the first half of the 12th century.

The synagogue was built in the Empire style in 1851–1853. It replaced an old synagogue first mentioned in 1613. The synagogue served its purpose until 1942. After the World War II, it was used as a warehouse, and today it is converted into a library and cultural centre.

In Ivančice is a large Jewish cemetery with Gothic and Renaissance tombs. It is the third oldest Jewish cemetery in the country. It was probably founded in the second half of the 15th century. The oldest preserved tombstone comes from 1548, 1552 or 1580. There is also the ceremonial hall built in 1902–1903. It contains a small museum exhibition on the history and monuments of the local Jewish community.

Notable people

Jan Blahoslav (1523–1571), humanistic writer; lived here
Christian Entfelder (1526–1544), anabaptist
Joachim Oppenheim (1832–1891), writer and rabbi
Guido Adler (1855–1941), musicologist
Alphonse Mucha (1860–1939), painter
Berthold Oppenheim (1867–1942), rabbi
Hugo Weisgall (1912–1997), composer
Zdeněk Růžička (1925–2021), gymnast
Vladimír Menšík (1929–1988), actor
Jan Procházka (1929–1971), writer and film director
Vojtěch Adam (born 1950), politician
Karel Večeřa (born 1955), football player and manager
Robert Plaga (born 1978), politician and university teacher
Patrik Auda (born 1989), basketball player
Tereza Fajksová (born 1989), Miss Earth 2012 titleholder
Barbora Krejčíková (born 1995), tennis player
Adam Hložek (born 2002), footballer

Twin towns – sister cities

Ivančice is twinned with:
 Radovljica, Slovenia
 Sládkovičovo, Slovakia
 Soyaux, France
 Stupava, Slovakia

References

External links

 
Populated places in Brno-Country District
Cities and towns in the Czech Republic
Jewish communities in the Czech Republic
Shtetls